The Qingdao–Yinchuan Expressway, designated as G20 and commonly referred to as the Qingyin Expressway is an expressway that connects the cities of Qingdao, Shandong, China, and Yinchuan, Ningxia.

Route
It passes through the following cities:
 Qingdao, Shandong
 Weifang, Shandong
 Zibo, Shandong
 Jinan, Shandong
 Shijiazhuang, Hebei
 Taiyuan, Shanxi
 Lishi District, Lüliang, Shanxi
 Jingbian County and Dingbian County, Yulin, Shaanxi
 Yinchuan, Ningxia

References

Chinese national-level expressways
Expressways in Shandong
Expressways in Hebei
Expressways in Shanxi
Expressways in Shaanxi
Expressways in Ningxia